Xóchitl Escobedo (born September 17, 1968) is a retired female tennis player from Mexico, who represented her native country at the 1988 Summer Olympics in Seoul, South Korea. She reached a career-high singles ranking on November 20, 1989, when she became ranked the number 284 in the world.

Escobedo is married to former Olympian Eduardo Nava and their son Emilio is a junior tennis player. Escobedo is also the aunt of ATP tennis player Ernesto Escobedo.

ITF Circuit finals

Singles: 6 (3–3)

Doubles: 18 (15-3)

External links
 
 
 
 
 

1968 births
Living people
Sportspeople from Zacatecas
Mexican female tennis players
Tennis players at the 1988 Summer Olympics
Olympic tennis players of Mexico
Place of birth missing (living people)
Tennis players at the 1995 Pan American Games
Pan American Games bronze medalists for Mexico
Pan American Games medalists in tennis
Central American and Caribbean Games medalists in tennis
Central American and Caribbean Games gold medalists for Mexico
Central American and Caribbean Games silver medalists for Mexico
Tennis players at the 1987 Pan American Games
20th-century Mexican women
21st-century Mexican women